The following is a list of known abandoned communities in Newfoundland and Labrador, Canada.

A
 Aaron Cove
 Aaron Island
 Abbate Point
 Abbott Cove
 Adnavik
 Aillik
 Alexander Bay Station
 Allan Cove
 Amelia Cove
 American Cove
 American Point
 Amos Cove
 Anderson's Cove
 Ann's Cove, Burin
 Anstey's Cove
 Antelope
 Anthony Island
 Apsey Cove
 Apsey Point
 Archie Campbell's Cove
 Ariege Bay
 Assizes Harbour
 Athlone
 Aquiller

B
 Baccalieu Island
 Bachelor's Cove
 Back Cove
 Back Shore
 Baker's Tickle
 Baie de Loutre
 Bait Cove
 Bake Apple Bight
 Bakers Brook
 Baker's Cove
 Baker's Head
 Baker's Tickle
 Bald Head
 Bald Nap
 Baldwin Cove
 Balena
 Ballyntine Cove
 Bane Harbor
 Bar Haven
 Bar Point
 Barachois
 Barge Bay
 Barren Island
 Barrett's Siding
 Barrocks
 Barrow
 Barrow Harbour
 Barrow Islands
 Bassitt's Harbour
 Bat's Path End
 Bateau Cove
 Batteau
 Battle Harbour
 Bay de East (Bay D'Est)
 Bay de L'Eau
 Bay de L'Eau Island
 Bay de Loup
 Bay des Vieux
 Bay du Nord, Fortune Bay
 Bay du Nord, Hermitage Bay
 Bayly's Cove
 Bay of Chaleur
 Bear Brook
 Bear Cove
 Bear Island
 Beaver Cove
 Beaverton
 Belldown's Point
 Betts Cove
 Big Brook
 Black Island, Bay of Exploits
 Black Island, Friday Bay
 Black Duck Cove, Trinity Bay
 Blanchard
 Blow me Down, Conception Bay
 Bluff Head Cove
 Bobby's Cove, Green Bay
 Bobby's Cove, Notre Dame Bay
 Bollard Town
 Bolster's Rock
 Bottle Cove
 Bradley's Cove
 Bragg's Island
 Brake's Cove
 Brazils
British Harbour
Broad Cove
 Broom Close
 Brown's Cove
 Brown's Cove, Sound Island
 Brunette
 Burnt Arm
 Burnt Island
 Burnt Island Tickle
 Burton's Pond

C
 Cambriol
 Canada Harbour
 Cape Island
 Cape La Hune
 Cape Roger Harbour
 Cape St. Charles
 Carrol Cove
 Castle Cove, near Keels
 Chateau Bay
 Chimney Cove
 Chimney Tickle (Labrador)
 Clattice Harbour
 Colinet Islands
 Comfort Bight
 Coney Arm
 Connaigre
 Conne
 Coppett
 Corbin, Burin Peninsula
 Corbin, Fortune Bay
 Crawleys Island
 Cul-de Sac West
 Cul-de Sac East
 Current Island

D
 Daniel's Cove
 Dantzig
 Darby's Harbour
 Davis Cove
 Davis Inlet
 Deep Harbour
 Deer Harbour
 Deer Island, Bonavista Bay
 Deer Island, South Coast
 Deer Lake Junction Brook
 Delby's Cove
 Doctor's Harbour
 Dog Cove
 Domino
 Dragon
 Duricle

E
 East Bay
 East St. Modeste
 Emily Harbour
 Exploits

F
 Facheux Bay
 Fair Island
 Femme
 Fischells
 Fischot Island
 Fisher's Cove
 Flat Islands, Bonavista Bay
 Flat Islands, Placentia Bay
 Flat Head
 Flatrock, Conception Bay
Ford's Harbour 
 Flowers Island
 Fox Island Harbour
Frenchman's Island
 Fry's Cove

G
 Gaff Topsails
 Garia
 George's Cove
 Gin Cove
 Goblin
 Goose Arm
 Gooseberry Cove, Placentia Bay
 Gooseberry Island
 Grand Bruit
 Grand John
 Great Bona
 Great Brule
 Great Jarvis
 Great Jervis
 Great Paradise
 Green Island
 Grey Islands
 Grole

H
 Harbour Buffett
 Harbour Island
 Haystack
 Hebron
 Henley Harbour
 Hodderville
 Hooping Harbour
 Hunt's Island

I
 Indian Burying Place
  Indian Harbour
 Indian Islands
 Iona
 Ireland's Eye
 Island Cove
 Isle Valen
 Ivanhoe

J
 Jemmy's Cove
 Jersey Harbour
 Jigging Hole, near Dunfield
 Jigging Cove
 John's Pond
 Julie's Harbour

K
 Kerley's Harbour
 King's Cove, District of Fortune Bay and Hermitage
 Kings Cove, Labrador
 Kings Cove, Northern Peninsula
 Kings Cove, Notre Dame Bay
 Kingwell

L
 La Manche
 Lally Cove
 Lancaster
 Langue de Cerf
 L'Anse-au-Diable
 Lears Cove
 Little Bay
 Little Bay Islands
 Little Bay West
 Little Bona
 Little Fogo Islands
 Little Harbour, Placentia Bay
 Little Harbour, Trinity Bay
 Little Harbour Deep
 Little Paradise
 Little Placentia Sound
 Little Port
 Lobster Cove
 Lobster Harbour
 Lockesporte
 Locks Cove
 Lomond
 Long Point
Loreburn
 Little Canada Harbour

M
 Mansfield Point
 McDougall's Gulch
 Merasheen
 Mercer's Cove
 Miller's Passage
 Mooney's Cove
Mosquito 
 Muddy Hole

N
Nachvak
 New Harbour, Fortune Bay
 Newell's Island
 Newport
 North West Arm
 Nutak

O
 Oderin
 Okak
 Osmond
 Otterbury

P
 Paddock's Bight
 Parsons Harbour
 Pass Island
 Patrick's Harbour
 Pays Cove
 Penguin Arm
 Piccaire
 Pinchard's Island
 Placentia Junction
 Point Crewe
 Point Enragée
 Popes Harbour
 Port Anne
 Port Elizabeth
 Port Nelson
 Port Royal
 Presque
 Prowseton
 Puddingbag Cove
 Pumbley Cove
 Pushthrough

Q
 Quarry

R
 Ramah
 Random Head Harbour
 Raymond's Point
 Red Cove
 Red Island
 Red Rocks
 Rencontre West
 Richard's Harbour
 Rider's Harbour
 Rogue's Harbour
 Rose au Rue
 Rosedale
 Roti Point
 Round Harbour
 Roundabout
 Ryle's Barrisway

S
 Sailor's Island, Bonavista Bay
 Sandy Cove, Fogo Island
 Sandy Point
 Safe Harbour
 Samson Island
 Sagona Island
 Shambler's Cove
 Siding At Georges Lake
 Silver Fox Island
 Smooth Cove
Snook's Arm
 Sooley's Cove
 Sop's Island
 Sound Island
 Southwest Croque
 Spencers Cove
 Spirity Cove
 Spout Cove
 Spread Eagle
 St. Anne's
 St. John Harbour
 St. Jones Without
 St. Joseph's
 St. Josephs Cove
 St. Kyran's
 St. Leonard's
 Stanley Cove
 Stanleyville
 Stone Valley
 Stone's Cove
 Swells Cove

T
 Table Bay
 Tack's Beach
 Taylor's Bay
 Tea Cove
 The Droke
 Thoroughfare
 Three Arms
 Tickle Beach
 Tickles
 Tim's Harbour
 Trammer
 Toslow
 Trinny Cove
 Turnip Cove

V
 Voys Beach

W
 Wandsworth
 Webber's
 Wellman's Cove
 West Point
 Western Arm
 Western Head
 Western Cove
 Williamsport
 White Rock
 Winter House Cove
 Woodford's Cove
 Woods Island
 Woody Island
 Wreck House
 Wild Cove, northern peninsula

Z
 Zoar

See also

List of ghost towns in Canada

References
 Smallwood, Joseph R. Encyclopedia of Newfoundland and Labrador, Volume 1, Newfoundland Book Publishers Ltd., 1967, p. 335-336
 
 

Newfoundland and Labrador
Ghost towns